Pachelmsky District is an administrative and municipal district (raion), one of the twenty-seven in Penza Oblast, Russia. It is located in the west of the oblast. Its administrative center is the urban locality (a work settlement) of Pachelma. As of the 2010 Census, the total population of the district was 16,310, with the population of Pachelma accounting for 49.4% of that number.

History
The district was established in 1928 within Penza Okrug of Middle Volga Oblast. It became a part of Penza Oblast in 1939.

References

Notes

Sources

Districts of Penza Oblast
States and territories established in 1928
